The short-eared dog (Atelocynus microtis), also known as the short-eared zorro or small-eared dog, is a unique and elusive canid species endemic to the Amazonian basin. This is the only species assigned to the genus Atelocynus.

Other names
The short-eared dog has many names in the local languages where it is endemic, including  in Portuguese,  ("short-ear fox") in Spanish,  in Chiquitano,  in Yucuna,  in Guarayu,  in Mooré, and achuj in Ninam and Mosetén.

Evolution and systematics
After the formation of the Isthmus of Panama in the latter part the Tertiary (about 2.5 million years ago in the Pliocene), canids migrated from North America to the southern continent as part of the Great American Interchange. The short-eared dog's ancestors adapted to life in tropical rainforests, developing the requisite morphological and anatomical features. Apart from its superficial resemblance to the bush dog, the short-eared dog seems not to be closely related to any fox-like or wolf-like canid. It is one of the most unusual canids.

Two subspecies of this canid are recognized, A. m. microtis and A. m. sclateri

Occurrence and environment

The short-eared dog can be found in the Amazon rainforest region of South America (in Brazil, Bolivia, Peru, Colombia, Ecuador and possibly Venezuela). There is a single report of "three slender, doglike animals" of this species sighted in the Darien region of Panama in 1984 by German biologist Sigi Weisel and a native Embera-nation Panamanian; this rare species' presence in Panama is possible because of "the continuous mass of forest habitat that covers this region". It lives in various parts of the rainforest environment, preferring areas with little human disturbance. It lives in both lowland forests known as Floresta Amazônica and terra firme forest, as well as in swamp forest, stands of bamboo, and cloud forest. It is a solitary animal and prefers moving in trees away from human and other animal interactions.

Appearance

The short-eared dog has short and slender limbs with short and rounded ears. It has a distinctive fox-like muzzle and bushy tail. Its paws are partly webbed, helping adapt it to its partly aquatic habitat.

Its fur ranges from dark to reddish-grey, but can also be nearly navy blue, coffee brown, dark grey, or chestnut-grey to black, and the coat is short, with thick and bristly fur. It has a somewhat narrow chest, with dark color variation on the thorax merging to brighter, more reddish tones on the abdominal side of the body.

Diet
This wild dog is mainly a carnivore, with fish, insects, and small mammals making up the majority of its diet. An investigation led in the Cocha Cashu Biological Station in Peru into the proportions of different kinds of food in this animal's diet produced the following results: fish (28%), insects (17%), small mammals (13%), various fruits (10%), birds (10%), crabs (10%), frogs (4%), and reptiles (3%).

Reproduction and behavior
This species has some unique behaviors not typical to other canids. Females of this species are about one-third larger than males. The excited male sprays a musk produced by the tail glands. It prefers a solitary lifestyle, in forest areas. It avoids humans in its natural environment. Agitated males raise the hairs on their backs.

The lifespan and gestation period of the short-eared dog are unknown, although sexual maturity is reached at three years of age, relatively late compared to other canid species.

Threats, survival, and ecological concerns
Feral dogs pose a prominent threat to the population of short-eared dogs, as they facilitate the spread of diseases such as canine distemper and rabies to the wild population. The short eared dog suffers greatly from loss of habitat. There is a significant amount of disturbance in formerly remote South American forests, and almost no habitat except where human settlers and prospectors pass daily destroy or expose their dens. Humans also contribute to their extermination by degradation of the species' natural habitat and the general destruction of tropical rainforests.

Status of conservation
The short-eared dog is currently considered near threatened by the IUCN. No comprehensive ecological and genetic research has been carried out on the species.

References

Further reading
 Alderton, David. Foxes, Wolves and Wild Dogs of the World. Blandford Press: United Kingdom, 1998.
 Nowak, Ronald. Walker's Carnivores of the World. The Johns Hopkins University Press: Baltimore, 2005.

External links
 IUCN/SSC Canid Specialist Group: Small Eared Zorro
Pro-carnivoros
Ecology and conservation of the short-eared dog by WildCru
Studies with a tame short-eared dog by Maria Renata Leite
Atelocynus microtis Research and Conservation by M. R. Pitman Leite
PHOTOS: Short-Eared Dog Caught in Camera Trap

Short haired Dog Video 25 May 2014 National Geographic

Cerdocyonina
Carnivorans of South America
Fauna of the Amazon
Mammals of Brazil
Mammals of Bolivia
Mammals of Colombia
Mammals of Ecuador
Mammals of Peru
Near threatened biota of South America
Mammals described in 1883
Taxa named by Philip Sclater